The Qutlugh-Khanids (otherwise known as the Qutlugh-Khanid dynasty, Kirmanid dynasty, or very rarely as the Later Western Liao) was a culturally Persianate dynasty of ethnic Khitan origin that ruled over Kirman (in present-day Kerman Province, Iran) from 1222 to 1306.

It was founded by Buraq Hajib, who emigrated from the Qara Khitai (Western Liao dynasty) during the collapse of the realm. Originally an independent entity, the Qutlugh-Khanid dynasty subsequently ruled as vassals of the Khwarazmian dynasty, the Mongol Empire and the Ilkhanate. The dynasty was removed from power by the Ilkhanid ruler Öljaitü, who appointed Nasir al-Din Muhammad ibn Burhan as governor of Kirman.

Later Western Liao 
Although there was no mention of a dynasty called the "Later Western Liao" (后西辽) in traditional Chinese scholarship, Wang Zhilai wrote a paper On the Later Western Liao (关于"后西辽") in 1983, where he proposed to call the Qutlugh-Khanids the "Later Western Liao", thereby positioning the dynasty as an extension of the Western Liao.

End of the Kirmanid dynasty
The Mongol Ilkhanid ruler Öljaitü (r. 1304–1316) ended the Kirman Kara-Khitan dynasty in 1306 after the last of the Qutlugh Khans, Quțb al-Dīn II, neglected to pay his dues to the Mongol treasury.  The Qutlugh Khan escaped to Shiraz, and his daughter later became the wife of Mubārriz al-Dīn Muhammad, the founder of the Muzaffarid dynasty.

List of monarchs of the Qutlugh-Khanid dynasty

Baraq Hajib (1222–1235)
Qutb al-Din Muhammad Khan (1235)
Rukn al-Din Khwajajuk (1235–1252)
Qutb al-Din Muhammad Khan (second reign; 1252–1257)
Muzaffar al-Din Hajjaj (1257–1267/8) (under regency of Kutlugh Turkan)
Kutlugh Turkan (1257–1282)
Jalal al-Din Suyurghatmish (1282–1292)
Safwat al-Din Padishah Khatun (1292–1295)
Kurdujin Khatun (1295)
Muzaffar al-Din Mohammad (1295–1304)
Yuluk Shah (1295) — in rebellion
Suyuk Shah (1301–1302) — in rebellion
Qutb al-Din Shah Jahan (1304–1306)

See also

 Qara Khitai
 Liao dynasty
 Khitan people

References

Sources 
 

 
Qara Khitai
1222 establishments in Asia
1306 disestablishments in Asia
People from Kerman